Robert Hindmarch (27 April 1961 – 5 November 2002) was an English footballer who played as a central defender.

Club career
Hindmarch made his debut for Sunderland on 14 January 1978 against Leyton Orient in a 2–2 draw at Brisbane Road. In total, he made 115 league appearances – the vast majority in the First Division – scoring two goals for the club.

The defender signed for Derby County in July 1984 where he spent six seasons at the club, making 164 appearances, scoring nine goals, and helping them to two successive promotions to reach the top flight. He joined Second Division Wolverhampton Wanderers in 1990 for £350,000 and was appointed club captain, but spent just a single season at Molineux. His time with the club was perhaps most known for a last minute equaliser he scored in the Black Country derby at West Bromwich Albion.

He dropped into the non-league with Telford United in May 1993, having gone two years without first team action at Wolves, and had a spell as player/manager of Irish club Cork City in the 1995/96 season. He later continued his coaching career by moving to New Jersey in the United States to work at a coaching school.
 
He died on 6 November 2002 after a battle with Motor neurone disease. He had two sons, Carl and Lee.

References

1961 births
2002 deaths
Cork City F.C. managers
League of Ireland players
Deaths from motor neuron disease
Neurological disease deaths in New Jersey
Derby County F.C. players
English footballers
English emigrants to the United States
League of Ireland managers
Association football defenders
People from Morpeth, Northumberland
Footballers from Northumberland
Portsmouth F.C. players
Sunderland A.F.C. players
Telford United F.C. players
English Football League players
Wolverhampton Wanderers F.C. players
English football managers